The 2009–10 season marked Burnley's first season in the Premier League and the end of the club's 33-year absence from the top flight of English football.

Burnley became the first newly promoted club to chalk up four successive home victories at the start of a Premier League season. The club ended the season in 18th position, however, and were relegated back to the Championship.

In June 2009 manager Owen Coyle signed a contract extension to remain at the club until the end of the 2012–13 season, but left in January to manage Bolton Wanderers. Eight days later Brian Laws was named as his replacement.

Team kit
The team kits for the 2009–10 season are produced by Erreà and the shirt sponsor is Cooke Oils. Both the home and away kits have been designed to replicate those worn by the Burnley team of 1960, when they were last crowned the champions of English football 50 years ago. The traditional V-neck claret and blue home jersey features the 50th anniversary logo, is embroidered with the club crest worn in that era and is finished with a claret and blue trim on the neck and sleeves and accompanied by plain white shorts and claret and blue hooped stockings identical to those worn by The Clarets when they won the First Division title. The away jersey is a white shirt with claret and blue trim on the V-neck and sleeves with black shorts and white stockings with claret and blue trim.

First-team squad 

As of 27 January 2010.

Current squad

Transfers

In

Out

Coaching staff

Statistics

Appearances and goals
Numbers in parentheses denote appearances as substitute.
Players with names struck through and marked  left the club during the playing season.
Players with names in italics and marked * were on loan from another club with Burnley.
Key to positions: GK – Goalkeeper; DF – Defender; MF – Midfielder; FW – Forward

Match details

Premier League

Final league table

FA Cup

Football League Cup

Friendlies
Burnley hosted an impromptu friendly against Accrington Stanley at Turf Moor on 8 September 2009, with all gate receipts going towards the "Save our Stanley" campaign to support the club while it faced financial difficulties.

References

Burnley F.C. seasons
Burnley